Brachypotherium is an extinct genus of rhinoceros that lived in Eurasia and Africa during the Miocene. A first upper decidual molar referrable to Brachypotherium brachypus was found during gold mining in New Caledonia during the 19th century, being misidentified as a species of marsupial known as Zygomaturus. However, rhinoceros were never native to New Caledonia, and the tooth was probably used as jewelry by a French convict deported there.

Many species of Brachypotherium have been described. Some species have moved to other genera, such as B. aurelianense being transferred to Diaceratherium. The genus was widespread during the Early and Middle Miocene, before heading into a decline. They went extinct in Eurasia by the beginning of the Late Miocene, with the African species B. lewisi surviving until the end of the epoch.

References

Miocene rhinoceroses
Miocene mammals of Europe
Miocene mammals of Asia
Miocene mammals of Africa
Fossil taxa described in 1904